Village Roadshow Pictures is the American subsidiary of the Australian co-producer and co-financier of major Hollywood motion pictures established in 1986. It is a division under Village Roadshow Entertainment Group (VREG), which in turn is owned by Australian media company of the same name. It has produced over 100 films since its establishment in 1986 including, as co-productions with Warner Bros., The Matrix series, the Sherlock Holmes series, the Happy Feet series, the Ocean’s series, The Lego Movie and Joker. The films in the Village Roadshow library have achieved 34 number one U.S. box office openings and received 50 Academy Award nominations, 19 Academy Awards and six Golden Globe Awards.

Village Roadshow Pictures self-distributes its film entertainment through affiliates in several territories around the world, including Australia, New Zealand and Singapore (the latter through Golden Village). J.P. Morgan Chase and Rabobank International provides some funding for Village Roadshow's film slate with Warner Bros. Village Roadshow had a secondary finance slate with Sony Pictures which ended in 2016.

History

Village Roadshow Pictures was formed in 1986. One of its original presidents was Greg Coote. In 1995, Village Roadshow Pictures was heading into their television division, headed by Greg Coote and Jeffrey Hayes. In 1996, the Village Roadshow Pictures Television unit started up a joint venture with animator Yoram Gross to start a venture company that was dedicated to animation. In 1997, Village Roadshow Pictures inked a deal with Intermedia to launch a joint venture company Village Intermedia Pictures. The deal up broke several months later. Also, Yoram Gross-Village Roadshow had signed EM.TV & Merchandising to a joint pact. On September 4, 1997, the company underwent restructuring with Michael Lake joined the company as managing director.

In 1997, the company had signed a first-look deal with Warner Bros. Pictures to finance their films for a five-year period. Bruce Berman, of the aborted Plan B Entertainment company was signed on as president of the studio. On October 2, 1998, Village Roadshow Pictures announced that they would shut down its television division in favor of launching a new company Coote/Hayes Productions, which would be headed by two Roadshow heads Greg Coote and Jeffrey Hayes. Also that year, Village Roadshow sold off its 50% stake in the Yoram Gross animated studio venture to EM.TV & Merchandising, which would become Yoram Gross-EM.TV.

In 2012, Warner Bros. Pictures and Village Roadshow Pictures had extended their co-financing first look deal through 2017. In May 2014, VRPG established a supplementary co-financing production deal with Sony Pictures Entertainment which commenced with the release of The Equalizer and Annie. A second agreement was made due to the large amount of available capital.

In 2015, VREG, the holding company of Village Roadshow Pictures and Village Roadshow Television, was recapitalized with a $480 million investment that included funds from Falcon Investment Advisors and Vine Alternative Investments. Falcon Investment Advisors and Vine Alternative Investments added additional capital in April 2017 to take a controlling stake in the corporation. This was to fund a new strategic plan for an expanded film slate and add production of television programs and other content forms.

More recently, his Phantom Four company held by David S. Goyer has struck a first look deal with Village Roadshow Pictures. On September 27, 2021, Bruce Berman announced that they would step himself down as CEO of the film studio.

Filmography

Warner Bros. Pictures

 Dead Calm (1989) (first film teamed up with Warner Bros. Pictures)
 The Delinquents (1989)
 Hurricane Smith (1992)
 The Power of One (1992) (co-production with Le Studio Canal+, Alcor Films and Regency Enterprises)
 Turtle Beach (1992) (co-production with Regency Enterprises and Le Studio Canal+)
 Bullet (1996) (under New Line Cinema)
 Tarzan and the Lost City (1998)
 Practical Magic (1998) (co-production with Fortis Films)
 Analyze This (1999)
 The Matrix (1999) (co-production with Silver Pictures)
 Deep Blue Sea (1999) 
 Love Lies Bleeding (1999)
 Three Kings (1999)
 Three to Tango (1999)
 Gossip (2000)
 Space Cowboys (2000) (co-production with Malpaso Productions)
 Red Planet (2000) (co-production with The Mark Canton Company)
 Miss Congeniality (2000) (co-production with Fortis Films and Castle Rock Entertainment)
 Valentine (2001)
 See Spot Run (2001)
 Exit Wounds (2001) (co-production with Silver Pictures)
 Swordfish (2001) (co-production with Silver Pictures)
 Cats & Dogs (2001) 
 Hearts in Atlantis (2001) (co-production with Castle Rock Entertainment)
 Training Day (2001)
 Ocean's Eleven (2001) (co-production with JW Productions)
 The Majestic (2001) (co-production with Castle Rock Entertainment)
 Queen of the Damned (2002)
 Showtime (2002)
 Eight Legged Freaks (2002) (co-production with Electric Entertainment)
 The Adventures of Pluto Nash (2002) (co-production with Castle Rock Entertainment)
 Ghost Ship (2002) (co-production with Dark Castle Entertainment)
 Analyze That (2002) 
 Two Weeks Notice (2002) (co-production with Fortis Films and Castle Rock Entertainment)
 Dreamcatcher (2003) (co-production with Castle Rock Entertainment)
 The Matrix Reloaded (2003) (co-production with Silver Pictures)
 Mystic River (2003) (co-production with Malpaso Productions)
 The Matrix Revolutions (2003) (co-production with Silver Pictures)
 Torque (2004) (co-production with Original Film) 
 Taking Lives (2004) (co-productions with Atmosphere Pictures)
 Catwoman (2004)
 Ocean's Twelve (2004) (co-production with JW Productions)
 Constantine (2005) (co-production with Vertigo DC Comics and The Donners' Company)
 Miss Congeniality 2: Armed and Fabulous (2005) (co-production with Fortis Films and Castle Rock Entertainment)
 House of Wax (2005) (co-production with Dark Castle Entertainment)
 Charlie and the Chocolate Factory (2005) (co-production with The Zanuck Company and Plan B Entertainment)
 The Dukes of Hazzard (2005)
 Rumor Has It… (2005)
 Firewall (2006) (co-production with Beacon Pictures)
 The Lake House (2006)
 Happy Feet (2006) (co-production with Kennedy Miller Productions)
 Unaccompanied Minors (2006) (co-production with The Donners' Company)
 Music and Lyrics (2007) (co-production with Castle Rock Entertainment)
 The Reaping (2007) (co-production with Dark Castle Entertainment)
 Lucky You (2007)
 Ocean's Thirteen (2007) (co-production with JW Productions)
 License to Wed (2007) (co-production with Phoenix Pictures)
 No Reservations (2007) (co-production with Castle Rock Entertainment)
 The Invasion (2007) (co-production with Silver Pictures)
 The Brave One (2007) (co-production with Silver Pictures)
 I Am Legend (2007) (co-production with Weed Road Pictures, Overbrook Entertainment, Heyday Films and Original Film)
 December Boys (2007) (with Warner Independent Pictures) (co-production with Becker Entertainment)
 Speed Racer (2008) (co-production with Silver Pictures)
 Get Smart (2008) (co-production with Mosaic Media Group)
 Nights in Rodanthe (2008)
 Yes Man (2008) (co-production with The Zanuck Company and Heyday Films)
 Gran Torino (2008) (co-production with Malpaso Productions)
 Where the Wild Things Are (2009) (co-production with Legendary Pictures, Playtone, and Wild Things Productions)
 Sherlock Holmes (2009) (co-production with Silver Pictures)
 Sex and the City 2 (2010) (with New Line Cinema) (co-production with HBO Films)
 Cats & Dogs: The Revenge of Kitty Galore (2010)
 Legend of the Guardians: The Owls of Ga'Hoole (2010) (co-production with Cruel and Unusual Films)
 Life as We Know It (2010)
 Happy Feet Two (2011) (co-production with Kennedy Miller Mitchell
 Sherlock Holmes: A Game of Shadows (2011) (co-production with Silver Pictures)
 The Lucky One (2012)
 Dark Shadows (2012) (co-production with Infinitum Nihil, GK Films and The Zanuck Company)
 Gangster Squad (2013)
 The Great Gatsby (2013) (co-production with Bazmark Productions)
 The Lego Movie (2014) (co-production with Warner Animation Group)
 Winter's Tale (2014) (co-production with Weed Road Pictures)
 Edge of Tomorrow (2014) (co-production with RatPac Entertainment and 3 Arts Entertainment)
 Into the Storm (2014) (with New Line Cinema)
 The Judge (2014) (co-production with RatPac Entertainment, Team Downey, and Big Kid Pictures)
 American Sniper (2014) (co-production with RatPac Entertainment and Malpaso Productions)
 Jupiter Ascending (2015) (co-production with RatPac Entertainment and Anarchos Productions)
 Mad Max: Fury Road (2015) (co-production with RatPac Entertainment and Kennedy Miller Mitchell)
 San Andreas (2015) (with New Line Cinema) (co-production with RatPac Entertainment, and Flynn Picture Company)
 In the Heart of the Sea (2015) (co-production with Roth Films and Imagine Entertainment)
 The Legend of Tarzan (2016) (co-production with RatPac Entertainment, Jerry Weintraub Productions, Riche/Ludwig Productions, and Beaglepug Productions)
 Sully (2016) (co-production with The Kennedy/Marshall Company, Flashlight Films, and Malpaso Productions)
 Collateral Beauty (2016) (with New Line Cinema) (co-production with Anonymous Content, RatPac Entertainment, Overbrook Entertainment, PalmStar Media and Likely Story)
  Fist Fight (2017) (with New Line Cinema) (co-production with 21 Laps Entertainment and Wrigley Pictures)
 Going in Style (2017) (with New Line Cinema) (co-production with RatPac Entertainment and De Line Pictures)
 King Arthur: Legend of the Sword (2017) (co-production with RatPac Entertainment, Weed Road Pictures, Safehouse Pictures, and Ritchie/Wigram Productions)
 The House (2017) (with New Line Cinema) (co-production with Good Universe and Gary Sanchez Productions)
 The 15:17 to Paris (2018) (co-production with Malpaso Productions)
 Ready Player One (2018) (co-production with Amblin Partners, Amblin Entertainment, De Line Pictures, and Farah Films & Management)
 Ocean's 8 (2018) (co-production with Smokehouse Pictures and Larger Than Life Productions)
 Joker (2019) (co-production with Bron Creative and DC Films)
 The Matrix Resurrections (2021) (co-production with Venus Castina Productions and Deutscher Filmförderfonds)

Columbia Pictures
 Fortress (1992) (co-production with Davis Entertainment) 
 Saving Silverman (2001) (co-production with Original Film) (first film teamed up with Columbia Pictures)
 The Equalizer (2014) (co-production with LStar Capital, Escape Artists, Mace Neufeld Productions and ZHIV)
 Annie (2014) (co-production with Overbrook Entertainment, March Media and Olive Bridge Entertainment)
 Goosebumps (2015) (co-production with LStar Capital, Sony Pictures Animation, Original Film and Scholastic Entertainment)
 Concussion (2015) (co-production with LStar Capital, Scott Free Productions, The Shuman Company, Cara Films, The Cantillon Company)
 The Brothers Grimsby (2016) (co-production with LStar Capital, Four by Two Films, Big Talk Productions and Working Title Films)
 Ghostbusters (2016) (co-production with Ghost Corps, The Montecito Picture Company, Pascal Pictures and Feigco Entertainment)
 The Magnificent Seven (2016) (co-production with Metro-Goldwyn-Mayer, LStar Capital, Pin High Productions and Escape Artists)
 Passengers (2016) (co-production with LStar Capital, Wanda Pictures, Original Film, Start Motion Pictures and Company Films)

Paramount Pictures

 The Phantom (1996) (co-production with The Ladd Company)
 Down to Earth (2001) (co-production with Alphaville Films)
 Zoolander (2001) (co-production with VH1 Films and Red Hour Productions)

20th Century Studios

 Don't Say a Word (2001) (co-production with Regency Enterprises)

Walt Disney Studios Motion Pictures

 Fortress (1992) (under Dimension Films) (co-production with Davis Entertainment)
 A Walk on the Moon (1999) (under Miramax Films)

Universal Pictures
 Man of Tai Chi (2013) (co-production with China Film Group and Wanda Media)
 Weird: The Al Yankovic Story (2022) (co-production Funny or Die, Tango Entertainment, and Ear Booker Productions)

The Weinstein Company

 Rogue (2008) (under Dimension Films) (co-production with Emu Creek Pictures)
 Man of Tai Chi (2013) (under RADiUS-TWC) (co-production with Universal Pictures, China Film Group and Wanda Media)

Carolco Pictures

 Bloodmoon (1990) (Village Roadshow distributed in Australia, while Carolco distributed elsewhere)

Artisan Entertainment

 Hotel de Love (1996) (under LIVE Entertainment) (co-production with Pratt Films)
 Critical Care (1997) (under LIVE Entertainment) (co-production with Mediaworks and ASAQ Film Partnership)

Savoy Pictures

 Lightning Jack (1994)

Vestron Pictures

 Rebel (1985)

Upcoming
 Furiosa (2024) (distributed by Warner Bros. Pictures) (co-production with Kennedy Miller Mitchell)
 Joker: Folie à Deux (2024) (co-production with Bron Creative, Joint Effort, and DC Studios)
 Ready Player Two (distributed by Warner Bros. Pictures) (co-production with Amblin Entertainment, De Line Pictures and Farah Films & Management)
 San Andreas 2 (TBA) (distributed by Warner Bros. Pictures; with New Line Cinema) (co-production with Flynn Picture Company)
 Sherlock Holmes 3 (TBA) (distributed by Warner Bros. Pictures) (co-production with Rideback, Team Downey and Silver Pictures)
 Training Day: Alonzo (TBA) (distributed by Warner Bros. Pictures) (co-production with Outlaw Productions)
 The Girl Who Loved Tom Gordon (TBA) (co-production with Vertigo Entertainment, Stampede Ventures, Sanibel Films, and Origin Story)
 I Am Legend 2 (TBA) (distributed by Warner Bros. Pictures)

References

External links
 

Film production companies of the United States
Mass media companies established in 1986
Companies based in Los Angeles
1986 establishments in California
Entertainment companies based in California